"Stars" is the debut single by Japanese singer Mika Nakashima. The single was released on November 7, 2001, reached number three on the weekly Oricon Singles Chart, and sold 469,180 copies, making it her highest-selling single to date. "Stars" was the theme song of the Japanese TV drama Kizudarake no Love Song, in which Mika also made her acting debut. The song is described as a luxurious, adult contemporary ballad with an easy listening-tinged arrangement and a haunting melody.

Track listing

Charts and sales

Single charts

Certifications

Release history

References

2001 debut singles
Mika Nakashima songs
Songs written by Yasushi Akimoto
Japanese television drama theme songs
2001 songs
Sony Music Entertainment Japan singles